Francine Lalonde (August 24, 1940 – January 17, 2014) was a Canadian politician who served on both the provincial and federal levels. Prior to being elected, she was a lecturer, teacher, and unionist.

She was minister responsible for the status of women in the Lévesque government from January 16, 1985 until June 5, 1985. She resigned following her defeat to Robert Bourassa in the by-election of June 3, 1985 in the electoral district of Bertrand, failing to win a seat in the National Assembly of Quebec.

She was a Bloc Québécois member of the House of Commons of Canada, representing the districts of La Pointe-de-l'Île from 2004 election to 2011, and Mercier from the 1993 election to 2004. She has in the past been the Bloc's critic of Human Resources Development and of Industry, and of Foreign Affairs.

In June 2005, Lalonde introduced in Parliament a private Bill C-407 that would have legalized assisted suicide in Canada. Re-elected in January 2006, she promised to reintroduce her bill to legalize assisted suicide.

On September 13, 2010, Lalonde announced she would not be a candidate for re-election following the expiration of her current mandate "because of the re-emergence of my cancer and the need to pursue new treatments". She died of cancer on January 17, 2014.

Electoral record

See also 
1985 Parti Québécois leadership election
Politics of Quebec
Quebec sovereignty movement

References

External links 
 

1940 births
2014 deaths
Bloc Québécois MPs
Canadian schoolteachers
Women government ministers of Canada
Women members of the House of Commons of Canada
Deaths from cancer in Quebec
Members of the Executive Council of Quebec
Members of the House of Commons of Canada from Quebec
Parti Québécois candidates in Quebec provincial elections
People from Saint-Hyacinthe
Trade unionists from Quebec
Women in Quebec politics
21st-century Canadian politicians
21st-century Canadian women politicians
Canadian women trade unionists